RLI Corp. is an American insurance company specializing in property insurance and casualty insurance. It is headquartered in Peoria, Illinois.

RLI conducts its operations primarily through four insurance subsidiaries — RLI Insurance Company, Mt. Hawley Insurance Company, RLI Indemnity Company and Contractors Bonding and Insurance Company.

History 
Founded in 1965 by Gerald D. Stephens, Replacement Lens, Inc. (RLI) was one of the first insurers of contact lenses. 

Eventually, the company emerged as one of the leading contact lens insurers in the United States. Building upon its success in the contact lens market, RLI further expanded its business into other niche insurance markets. 

Over time, the demand for contact lens insurance shrank with the emergence of more affordable disposable soft lenses. In order to remain competitive, Stephens expanded RLI's offerings to include commercial property and liability insurance. In 1994, the company retired its founding contact lens insurance product and in 1996 RLI sold its RLI Vision unit to Maui Jim, a manufacturer of luxury sunglasses.

References

Companies listed on the New York Stock Exchange
Financial services companies established in 1965
Companies based in Peoria, Illinois
Insurance companies based in Illinois